The Penn Club of New York (usually referred to as The Penn Club) is an American private, social club located in the Midtown Manhattan neighborhood of New York City. Its membership is restricted to University of Pennsylvania alumni, students, faculty, and family members thereof, with affiliate and reciprocal membership to select institutions. The club is headquartered at 30 West 44th Street, a 14-story building originally occupied by the Yale Club of New York City. For numerous consecutive terms, The Penn Club won the Platinum Club of America award, placing it in the top 3% among 6,000 clubs in the U.S. for perceived excellence, and ranked #14 best city club in the U.S., and #2 city club in New York City.

History
In November 1886, the first local group of University of Pennsylvania alumni outside of Philadelphia was formed in New York over dinner at Delmonico's Restaurant. At the alumni group's annual banquet at The Waldorf-Astoria Hotel in January 1900, they presented a plan to secure "a convenient suite of rooms in the middle of the city, adjacent to a cafe."

Royalton Hotel location
The Penn Club soon had more than 150 members at a time when only 400 alumni lived in the New York area, and received its charter from the New York Legislature in 1901.

Hotel Stanley
In 1905, the Club moved to "new and commodious quarters" in the Hotel Stanley at 124 West 47th Street, where it remained until 1910. Between 1911 and 1922, however, the Club did away with a clubhouse, instead focusing on their annual banquet.

Townhouses
In 1922, after a three-year search, the club's directors leased two townhouses on East 50th Street, next to what today is the New York Palace Hotel. Throughout the 1920s, the Penn Club on East 50th Street was active and successful. Its dining and guest rooms were regularly filled and its dinners and programs were highly attended. The Great Depression, though, quickly hit the Club hard, and it vacated its townhouses in 1935.

Cornell Club, Phi Gamma Delta Club, and Biltmore Hotel
Thereafter, it shared space in the Cornell Club on East 38th Street, moved to two other clubs, and finally settled in the Phi Gamma Delta Club on West 56th Street, where it remained until 1961, when it moved to the Biltmore Hotel. The Club stayed in the Biltmore Hotel until the hotel was gutted and made an office tower in 1981 by Paul Milstein.

Former Yale Club headquarters
In 1989, the university bought the current 14-story building at 30 West 44th Street for $15 million. After raising a separate $25 million (including $150,000+ donations each from Estee Lauder heirs Leonard Lauder and Ronald Lauder, as well as Donald Trump, Saul Steinberg, Michael Milken, and Ronald Perelman) and two years of renovation, the Penn Club moved to its current location on West 44th Street between Fifth Avenue and Sixth Avenue, opening doors in 1994.

Membership
Membership in the Penn Club is restricted to alumni, faculty, full-time staff, and students over the age of 21 of the University of Pennsylvania, with a shortlist of schools being able to share the club as affiliate members, including Columbia University, Fordham University, University of Chicago, Vanderbilt University, Trinity College (Connecticut) Emory University, Washington College, and Villanova University. The club offers legacy memberships to spouses, parents, grandparents, children, grandchildren, and siblings of University of Pennsylvania-affiliated members.

With more than 5,000 members around the world, The Penn Club is controlled by its members and managed by staff, although the University of Pennsylvania owns the clubhouse building and leases it to the club, a 501(c)7 not-for-profit entity. The university's development and alumni relations department maintains a regional office in the clubhouse.

Amenities
All members enjoy full use of the clubhouse facilities and its services. The high-rise, 14-story clubhouse includes two restaurants and bars: the double-story Main Dining Room, which requires a jacket for men and can also be rented for events on weekends, and the Grill Room, which has a sushi chef. Its Benjamin Franklin Living Room (named after the university's founder) features a fireplace, piano, paintings of Penn leaders such as Benjamin Franklin and President Amy Gutmann, and 24/7 library for members to check out books, and the business center has workspaces and conference rooms. In addition to five floors of 39 guestrooms, there is a Palestra Fitness Center and 13th-floor terrace.

Members may also use the squash courts at the Yale Club of New York City, and have access to more than 150 reciprocal private clubs worldwide, including yacht clubs, country clubs, and golf clubs.

Social networking and Clubhouse Row
Situated at 30 West 44th Street, the Penn Club is located on Clubhouse Row directly in front of the Harvard Club of New York at 27 West 44th, on the same block as the Cornell Club of New York at 6 East 44th and New York Yacht Club at 37 West 44th, and a block away from the Yale Club of New York City on East 44th (and Vanderbilt) and Princeton Club of New York at 15 West 43rd for inter-club events. Despite being in New York City, Columbia University is in residence at The Penn Club, while Dartmouth shares with the Yale Club and Brown shares the Cornell Club.

The club hosts annual events including an inter-club New Year's Eve celebration, members-only celebrations on all major holidays, and regular social networking events on cultural, intellectual, professional, and personal subjects.

Membership also includes access to a members-only Penn Club website and app, and "Societies" or committees to help members network.

Notable members
 Donald Trump (Wharton '68, transferred after two years at Fordham)—donated over $100,000 to the Penn Club of New York, 45th U.S. President
 Ivanka Trump (Wharton '04, transferred after two years at Georgetown)—socialite

In popular culture
 In the first episode of Season 5 of The Apprentice, the winning team was rewarded with lunch with Donald Trump at the Penn Club.

See also
 Columbia University Club of New York
 List of American gentlemen's clubs

References

External links
 

Culture of Manhattan
Organizations established in 1901
Gentlemen's clubs in New York City
University of Pennsylvania